Ilba may refer to:

 Ilba, a village in Cicârlău, Romania
 Ilba (river), a river in Romania
 Yilba people, also spelt Ilba, an Aboriginal Australian people
Yilba language, language of the Yilba people

See also 
 Elba (disambiguation)
 IIBA
 LLBA

Language and nationality disambiguation pages